The 1916 University Farm football team represented the University Farm—now known as the University of California, Davis—as an independent during the 1916 college football season. Although "University Farm" was the formal name for the school and team, in many newspaper articles from the time it was called "Davis Farm". The team had no nickname in 1916, with the "Aggie" term being introduced in 1922. Led by Robert E. Harmon in his second and final season as head coach, the team compiled a record of 6–1–1 and was outscored its opponents 151 to 63 for the season. The University Farm played home games in Davis, California.

In two seasons under Harmon, the University Farm compiled a record of 9–3–1, for a .731 winning percentage.

Schedule

Notes

References

University Farm
UC Davis Aggies football seasons
University Farm football